The 4th Mechanised Infantry Brigade is a brigade of the Turkish Army based in the Marmara Region at the town of Keşan in Edirne Province. It is part of the Army's 2nd Corps based at Gelibolu in Çanakkale Province, in the General Fevzi Mengüç Barracks, and is in charge of monitoring the Greek border.

History 
During World War II, the 4th Infantry Division was based in Gallipoli. It still existed as a division in 1987-88. Since 1994, it has been transformed into a modern military formation as a mechanised infantry brigade.

From 2016 to 2020, servicemen of the 4th Mechanised Infantry Brigade, alongside the 54th Mechanised Infantry Brigade, Edirne Police Department and Gendarmerie General Command, detained over a thousand people convicted of being part of the Gülen movement, as well as PKK and MLKP members who tried to cross the Greek border. Its previous commander was Brig. Gen. Hasan Demir.

References 

Brigades of Turkey
Military in Edirne
Keşan District
Mechanised brigades